Vilas County has more lakes than any other county in Wisconsin, with 563 named and 755 unnamed lakes covering 93,889 acres. Lac Vieux Desert near Phelps, at 4017 acres, is the largest.

Named lakes are listed below. Alternate names are indicated in parentheses.

See also 

 List of lakes in Wisconsin

References 

Lakes in Vilas County, Wisconsin
Lakes